Retrospective I: 1974 to 1980 is a compilation album by Canadian rock band Rush, released in 1997 (see 1997 in music). The album features songs from the first decade of the band.  The set is not in chronological order.

This compilation album is now disc one of the 2006 Rush compilation album Gold, with "Something for Nothing" replaced by "Working Man".  Cover art was painted by Canadian artist Dan Hudson.

Track listing

Personnel 
Geddy Lee    – bass guitars, vocals, synthesizers
Alex Lifeson – electric and acoustic guitars
Neil Peart   – drums, percussion, lyricist
John Rutsey  – drums on "Finding My Way"

See also 
 Retrospective II
 Gold
 Retrospective III: 1989–2008

References 

1997 compilation albums
Anthem Records compilation albums
Rush (band) compilation albums
Mercury Records compilation albums